Taprobanea is a genus of flowering plants from the orchid family, Orchidaceae. There is only one known species, Taprobanea spathulata, native to India and to Sri Lanka.

See also
List of Orchidaceae genera

References

External links
Orchid Tropical, ธาโปบาเนียร์ สปาธูลาตา ( Taprobanea spathulata ) - กล้วยไม้ (in Thai but nice photos)

Orchids of India
Orchids of Sri Lanka
Monotypic Epidendroideae genera
Vandeae genera
Aeridinae